Storkletten Peak is an ice-free mountain  south of Flarjuven Bluff on the Ahlmann Ridge in Queen Maud Land, Antarctica. It was mapped by Norwegian cartographers from surveys and air photos by Norwegian-British-Swedish Antarctic Expedition (NBSAE) (1949–52) and named Storkletten, meaning the big, steep mountain.

Mountains of Queen Maud Land
Princess Martha Coast